Kubang Kerian is the royal town of Kelantan and also a parliamentary constituency in Kota Bharu District, Kelantan, Malaysia. The Universiti Sains Malaysia (USM), Health Campus is located here. This campus is also referred to as USM Health Campus. The campus houses 3 schools - the School of Medical Sciences, the School of Dentistry and the School of Health Sciences. A 760-bed teaching hospital is located on campus. This is the Hospital Universiti Sains Malaysia (HUSM).

Kubang Kerian is about 10–15 minutes drive on highway 8 from Kota Bharu, the capital city, depending on the traffic condition. Kubang Kerian is about 15–20 minutes from the airport in Pengkalan Chepa. However, if commuters prefer to take a taxi, RM30 will be charged if the taxi is taken from the airport to Kubang Kerian. If a taxi is taken between 12 a.m. to 6 a.m., taxi charges will include another 50% additional night service charge, which costs RM45.

Kubang Kerian has become a new economic hub for Kelantan. The setup of the USM Health Campus in Kubang Kerian since 1983 has attracted other businesses to move to Kubang Kerian, which help to boost the economy of Kubang Kerian. Kubang Kerian now has a fresh market, daily night markets, Friday night market, Monday night market, several fresh chicken slaughter outlets, few photoshops, 2 pharmacies, 2 bookshops, 1 shoe shop, many beauty shops and many eateries such as bakeries, KFC, Domino's, Pizza Hut, Subway, D'Klasik, One Stop Kopitiam and Prima House.

There are also several places to stay in Kubang Kerian which helps a lot of people getting their stay there, whether it is for hospital needs or tourism. There are a lot of emerging new budget hotels and inns which are available across the road from Hospital Universiti Sains Malaysia (HUSM). Some of the renowned hotel among them are Bintang Square Hotel and 3-stars Al Khatiri Hotel. There is also residential suite named Anjung Vista which lies between 2 traffic lights in Kubang Kerian and on the same road to HUSM.

There are many places to shop for food, batik, scarves, toiletries etc., at Kubang Kerian Square in Kubang Kerian. Mydin is located across the major junction into HUSM. It offers goods at affordable prices for families and students on small budgets.

Banks are nearby Mydin and along the road parallel to the trunk road passing in front of HUSM. They include Maybank, Bank Islam, Bank Rakyat, BSN, and CIMB.

Internet centres here are TM and Digi.

Being a Muslim-majority area, Kubang Kerian has many mosques, but no churches or temples. The largest mosque is the al-Sultan Ismail Petra Mosque, which is 5 minutes from USM.

Every year, due to new intake of students, parents flock the area during the September student intake. However, the interview session for intake of Universiti Sains Malaysia occurs around May annually. Thus, parents and students are advised to make early reservations for a place to stay in Kubang Kerian - at the inns, apartments and local guest house. There are also homestays in Kubang Kerian area.
For those who prefer to stay with low budget and wanted a comfortable, affordable stay, they can stay at Bintang Square Hotel  which is located in front and walking distance from the HUSM.
For those who prefer to commute and have cars, they can stay at the Renaissance Hotel  which can provide a more luxurious stay in Kota Bharu.

Please take note that an hour of driving is to be expected from Kota Bharu to HUSM in case of traffic jam during peak season - May and September, school holidays, and festive seasons.

Government and politics
Kubang Kerian is represented in the Malaysian Parliament by Tuan Ibrahim Tuan Man of PAS. The constituency is further divided into three seats in the Kelantan State Legislative Assembly:
 Salor;
 Pasir Tumbuh; and
 Demit.

The latter 3 seats are currently held by PAS.

In terms of local government, the Pasir Tumbuh and Demit constituencies fall under the jurisdiction of the Kota Bharu Municipal Council (MPKB-BRI) while the Salor constituency is administered by the Ketereh District Council.

References

Towns in Kelantan